BBM or Bbm may refer to:

Music 
 B-flat minor, abbreviated as B♭m or Bbm
 Bruce-Baker-Moore, a short-lived rock band consisting of bassist Jack Bruce, drummer Ginger Baker and guitarist Gary Moore
 "BBM", a 2011 song by Philippine rock duo Turbo Goth
 BBMak, English R&B group
 Billboard Music Awards, BBMA

Places 
 BBM, the IATA code for Battambang Airport in Battambang, Cambodia
 Battle of Britain Monument, London
 Battle of Britain Memorial, Capel-le-Ferne

Education 
 Bachelor of Business Management

Technology and information 
 BBM (software), a proprietary Instant Messenger application formerly known as BlackBerry Messenger
 "Bolded by me", Internet forum slang indicating that the sender has emphasized part(s) of quoted text with boldface type
 BlackBerry Mobile, a phone manufacturer
 Break-before-make, a type of contact arrangement of an electrical switch
 The Benjamin–Bona–Mahony equation, a model equation for surface gravity waves of long wavelength and propagating unidirectionally
 Armoured fighting vehicle (or )

Radio 
 BBM Canada, an audience measurement organization for Canadian television and radio broadcasting
 WBBM (AM), a radio station (780 AM) licensed to Chicago, Illinois, United States
 WBBM-FM, a radio station (96.3 FM) licensed to Chicago, Illinois, United States
 WBBM-TV, a television station (channel 2 analog/12 digital) licensed to Chicago, Illinois, United States

Politics and government 
 Bongbong Marcos, 17th and incumbent President of the Philippines
 Bintang Bakti Masyarakat, the Public Service Star awarded by the Singapore government to a person for public service
 Boys' Brigade in Malaysia, the Malaysia Branch of the Boys' Brigade

Language 

 bbm, ISO 639-3 code for the Bango language